Marcel Schreter (born 29 September 1981) is an Austrian footballer who plays for SV Telfs in the Tiroler Liga.

References

1981 births
Living people
Sportspeople from Innsbruck
Footballers from Tyrol (state)
Austrian footballers
Austrian Football Bundesliga players
WSG Tirol players
FC Wacker Innsbruck (2002) players
SC Austria Lustenau players
Association football midfielders